Francisco Cabrera may refer to:

 Francisco Cabrera (baseball) (born 1966), former baseball player
 Francisco Cabrera (cyclist) (born 1979), Chilean cyclist
 Francisco Adolfo Cabrera, Argentine engineer
 Francisco Verdugo Cabrera (1561–1636), Roman Catholic prelate